The white-bellied honeyeater (Glycifohia notabilis), also known as the New Hebrides honeyeater, is a species of bird in the family Meliphagidae.  It is endemic to the Melanesian island nation of Vanuatu.

References

white-bellied honeyeater
Birds of Vanuatu
Endemic fauna of Vanuatu
white-bellied honeyeater
Taxonomy articles created by Polbot
Taxobox binomials not recognized by IUCN